A standing wheelchair (also known as a standing chair, a wheeled stander or a stander) is assistive technology, similar to a standing frame, that allows a wheelchair user to raise the chair from a seated to a standing position. The standing wheelchair supports the person in a standing position and enables interaction with people and objects at eye level.

Types and function 
Standing wheelchairs can be either manually operated, have power-operated wheels but manual lifting mechanisms or be fully powered with, for example, hydraulic lifting mechanisms. They are used both to achieve regular mobility and to stand the person up using hydraulics or other power sources. Some standing wheelchairs may be driven from the standing position, however there is some medical concern of an increased risk of long bone fractures while driving due to the legs being under a heavy load.

Diagnosis and users 
Standing wheelchairs are used by people with mild to severe disabilities including: spinal cord injury, traumatic brain injury, cerebral palsy, spina bifida, muscular dystrophy, multiple sclerosis, stroke, rett syndrome, post-polio syndrome and more.

Standing chairs are used by people with both paraplegia and quadriplegia, since a variety of standing options are available to accommodate for mild-to-severe disabilities.

Health benefits 
Numerous studies have shown evidence that standing wheelchairs may provide specific health benefits. Some of these health benefits include improved circulation, urinary health, bowel function and bone density. Standing wheelchairs may also improve overall quality of life and independence among users.

Documentation and funding 

Medicare may help fund some portion of a standing wheelchair, while Medicaid funding varies from state to state in the U.S. Many insurance companies, vocational rehabilitation organizations, and medical case managers are increasingly funding standing wheelchairs because of the long-term health and quality of life benefits that come from passive standing.

Effective documentation 
Funding (government funding or insurance) for standing equipment is achievable, but usually requires medical justification and a letter of medical necessity (a detailed prescription) written by a physical therapist or medical professional.

Funding sources 
In the U.S. there are various funding options for purchasing durable medical equipment (DME) such as standing wheelchairs:
 Public insurance/government funding (i.e. Medicaid, Waivers, etc.)
 Private insurance companies (i.e. Blue Cross, health maintenance organizations (HMOs), PPOs, etc.)
 Worker's compensation
 Disability insurance
 Liability insurance (i.e. car, home, etc.)
 Out-of-pocket (cash or credit card)
 Possible payment plan through supplier
 Child's school purchase for use at school (i.e. standing is part of child's Individualized Education Program (IEP))
 Purchase by workplace for use while on the job
 Purchase through VA Hospital
 Assistance from local groups such (i.e. Rotary clubs, Lions, etc.)
 Assistance from disability groups (i.e.  MDA, MS Society, etc.)
Most states have resources such as PAAT (Protection Advocacy for Assistive Technology) and State Technology Assistance Projects that are resources for consumers seeking funding or going through the appeals process.

References 

Assistive technology
Wheelchairs
Accessibility
Medical equipment